AfterLife is a 2003 drama film set in Scotland directed by Alison Peebles and written by Andrea Gibb. It stars Lindsay Duncan, Kevin McKidd, Paula Sage, and James Laurenson. Afterlife won the Audience Award at The Edinburgh Film Festival 2003. Sage's role won her a BAFTA Scotland award for best first time performance and Best Actress in the Bratislava International Film Festival, 2004.

Plot
An ambitious Scottish journalist is forced to choose between his high-flying career or caring for his younger sister who has Down syndrome.

Cast

Lindsay Duncan	as May Brogan
Kevin McKidd as Kenny Brogan
Paula Sage as Roberta Brogan
James Laurenson as Professor Wilkinshaw
Shirley Henderson as Ruby
Fiona Bell as Lucy
Anthony Strachan as Mike
Emma D'Inverno as Rosa Mendoza
Eddie Marsan as Walters Jez
Isla Blair as Jackson, Dr
Stuart Davids as Big Tony
Julie Austin as Foghorn Heather
Martin Carroll as Bingo manager
Maureen Carr as Cissie
Molly Innes as Social worker
Isabelle Joss as Care home nurse
Julie Wilson Nimmo as Hospital nurse
Alison Peebles as Radiographer

External links
Film4 Search results for AfterLife

2003 films
Down syndrome in film
Scottish films
English-language Scottish films
2000s English-language films
Films about disability